The 2005–06 Colorado Avalanche season was the 11th operational season and 10th playing season since the franchise relocated from Quebec prior to the start of the 1995–96 NHL season. As well as the franchise's 27th season in the National Hockey League and 34th season overall.

Offseason

Regular season

Final standings

Playoffs

Schedule and results

Regular season

|- align="center" bgcolor="#FFBBBB"
|1||L||October 5, 2005||3–4 || align="left"| @ Edmonton Oilers (2005–06) ||0–1–0 || 
|- align="center" bgcolor="#CCFFCC" 
|2||W||October 8, 2005||3–2 || align="left"| @ Dallas Stars (2005–06) ||1–1–0 || 
|- align="center" bgcolor="#CCFFCC" 
|3||W||October 10, 2005||7–3 || align="left"|  Calgary Flames (2005–06) ||2–1–0 || 
|- align="center" bgcolor="#FFBBBB"
|4||L||October 12, 2005||4–5 || align="left"|  Nashville Predators (2005–06) ||2–2–0 || 
|- align="center" 
|5||L||October 14, 2005||2–3 SO|| align="left"|  Chicago Blackhawks (2005–06) ||2–2–1 || 
|- align="center" bgcolor="#FFBBBB"
|6||L||October 19, 2005||4–5 || align="left"|  Los Angeles Kings (2005–06) ||2–3–1 || 
|- align="center" bgcolor="#CCFFCC" 
|7||W||October 21, 2005||7–1 || align="left"| @ Edmonton Oilers (2005–06) ||3–3–1 || 
|- align="center" bgcolor="#FFBBBB"
|8||L||October 22, 2005||4–6 || align="left"| @ Vancouver Canucks (2005–06) ||3–4–1 || 
|- align="center" bgcolor="#CCFFCC" 
|9||W||October 25, 2005||5–3 || align="left"|  Edmonton Oilers (2005–06) ||4–4–1 || 
|- align="center" bgcolor="#CCFFCC" 
|10||W||October 27, 2005||6–2 || align="left"|  Vancouver Canucks (2005–06) ||5–4–1 || 
|- align="center" bgcolor="#CCFFCC" 
|11||W||October 29, 2005||4–3 OT|| align="left"|  Vancouver Canucks (2005–06) ||6–4–1 || 
|-

|- align="center" bgcolor="#CCFFCC" 
|12||W||November 3, 2005||4–3 || align="left"|  Mighty Ducks of Anaheim (2005–06) ||7–4–1 || 
|- align="center" 
|13||L||November 5, 2005||2–3 SO|| align="left"|  Dallas Stars (2005–06) ||7–4–2 || 
|- align="center" bgcolor="#CCFFCC" 
|14||W||November 8, 2005||5–2 || align="left"|  San Jose Sharks (2005–06) ||8–4–2 || 
|- align="center" bgcolor="#CCFFCC" 
|15||W||November 10, 2005||5–3 || align="left"| @ Vancouver Canucks (2005–06) ||9–4–2 || 
|- align="center" bgcolor="#FFBBBB"
|16||L||November 12, 2005||3–5 || align="left"| @ Calgary Flames (2005–06) ||9–5–2 || 
|- align="center" bgcolor="#FFBBBB"
|17||L||November 14, 2005||2–5 || align="left"|  Edmonton Oilers (2005–06) ||9–6–2 || 
|- align="center" bgcolor="#CCFFCC" 
|18||W||November 16, 2005||3–1 || align="left"| @ Phoenix Coyotes (2005–06) ||10–6–2 || 
|- align="center" bgcolor="#CCFFCC" 
|19||W||November 18, 2005||3–2 || align="left"| @ Mighty Ducks of Anaheim (2005–06) ||11–6–2 || 
|- align="center" bgcolor="#FFBBBB"
|20||L||November 19, 2005||3–4 || align="left"| @ Los Angeles Kings (2005–06) ||11–7–2 || 
|- align="center" 
|21||L||November 21, 2005||2–3 SO|| align="left"|  Calgary Flames (2005–06) ||11–7–3 || 
|- align="center" bgcolor="#FFBBBB"
|22||L||November 23, 2005||3–7 || align="left"| @ Detroit Red Wings (2005–06) ||11–8–3 || 
|- align="center" bgcolor="#CCFFCC" 
|23||W||November 25, 2005||5–0 || align="left"| @ Columbus Blue Jackets (2005–06) ||12–8–3 || 
|- align="center" bgcolor="#CCFFCC" 
|24||W||November 27, 2005||6–2 || align="left"|  Vancouver Canucks (2005–06) ||13–8–3 || 
|- align="center" bgcolor="#CCFFCC" 
|25||W||November 29, 2005||3–2 || align="left"| @ Edmonton Oilers (2005–06) ||14–8–3 || 
|- align="center" bgcolor="#FFBBBB"
|26||L||November 30, 2005||2–5 || align="left"| @ Vancouver Canucks (2005–06) ||14–9–3 || 
|-

|- align="center" bgcolor="#FFBBBB"
|27||L||December 4, 2005||4–6 || align="left"|  Buffalo Sabres (2005–06) ||14–10–3 || 
|- align="center" bgcolor="#CCFFCC" 
|28||W||December 7, 2005||4–1 || align="left"|  Boston Bruins (2005–06) ||15–10–3 || 
|- align="center" bgcolor="#CCFFCC" 
|29||W||December 9, 2005||4–3 SO|| align="left"| @ New Jersey Devils (2005–06) ||16–10–3 || 
|- align="center" bgcolor="#FFBBBB"
|30||L||December 10, 2005||3–4 || align="left"| @ Pittsburgh Penguins (2005–06) ||16–11–3 || 
|- align="center" bgcolor="#FFBBBB"
|31||L||December 12, 2005||2–6 || align="left"|  Ottawa Senators (2005–06) ||16–12–3 || 
|- align="center" bgcolor="#FFBBBB"
|32||L||December 17, 2005||4–5 || align="left"| @ New York Islanders (2005–06) ||16–13–3 || 
|- align="center" bgcolor="#CCFFCC" 
|33||W||December 18, 2005||2–1 || align="left"| @ New York Rangers (2005–06) ||17–13–3 || 
|- align="center" bgcolor="#FFBBBB"
|34||L||December 20, 2005||2–3 || align="left"| @ Nashville Predators (2005–06) ||17–14–3 || 
|- align="center" bgcolor="#CCFFCC" 
|35||W||December 22, 2005||4–3 || align="left"|  Minnesota Wild (2005–06) ||18–14–3 || 
|- align="center" bgcolor="#FFBBBB"
|36||L||December 23, 2005||3–5 || align="left"| @ Minnesota Wild (2005–06) ||18–15–3 || 
|- align="center" bgcolor="#CCFFCC" 
|37||W||December 26, 2005||7–4 || align="left"|  Phoenix Coyotes (2005–06) ||19–15–3 || 
|- align="center" bgcolor="#FFBBBB"
|38||L||December 28, 2005||3–5 || align="left"|  Los Angeles Kings (2005–06) ||19–16–3 || 
|- align="center" bgcolor="#FFBBBB"
|39||L||December 30, 2005||2–5 || align="left"| @ San Jose Sharks (2005–06) ||19–17–3 || 
|- align="center" bgcolor="#CCFFCC" 
|40||W||December 31, 2005||5–2 || align="left"| @ Phoenix Coyotes (2005–06) ||20–17–3 || 
|-

|- align="center" bgcolor="#CCFFCC" 
|41||W||January 3, 2006||3–0 || align="left"|  Nashville Predators (2005–06) ||21–17–3 || 
|- align="center" bgcolor="#CCFFCC" 
|42||W||January 5, 2006||4–2 || align="left"| @ Minnesota Wild (2005–06) ||22–17–3 || 
|- align="center" bgcolor="#CCFFCC" 
|43||W||January 7, 2006||3–2 SO|| align="left"|  Columbus Blue Jackets (2005–06) ||23–17–3 || 
|- align="center" bgcolor="#CCFFCC" 
|44||W||January 9, 2006||6–1 || align="left"|  St. Louis Blues (2005–06) ||24–17–3 || 
|- align="center" bgcolor="#CCFFCC" 
|45||W||January 11, 2006||2–1 || align="left"|  Montreal Canadiens (2005–06) ||25–17–3 || 
|- align="center" bgcolor="#CCFFCC" 
|46||W||January 14, 2006||4–3 OT|| align="left"| @ Philadelphia Flyers (2005–06) ||26–17–3 || 
|- align="center" bgcolor="#CCFFCC" 
|47||W||January 17, 2006||5–3 || align="left"|  Toronto Maple Leafs (2005–06) ||27–17–3 || 
|- align="center" bgcolor="#FFBBBB"
|48||L||January 19, 2006||2–4 || align="left"| @ Chicago Blackhawks (2005–06) ||27–18–3 || 
|- align="center" bgcolor="#FFBBBB"
|49||L||January 21, 2006||3–4 || align="left"|  Detroit Red Wings (2005–06) ||27–19–3 || 
|- align="center" bgcolor="#CCFFCC" 
|50||W||January 24, 2006||7–4 || align="left"|  Calgary Flames (2005–06) ||28–19–3 || 
|- align="center" 
|51||L||January 26, 2006||2–3 SO|| align="left"|  Dallas Stars (2005–06) ||28–19–4 || 
|- align="center" 
|52||L||January 28, 2006||3–4 SO|| align="left"|  Vancouver Canucks (2005–06) ||28–19–5 || 
|- align="center" bgcolor="#CCFFCC" 
|53||W||January 31, 2006||3–2 || align="left"|  Minnesota Wild (2005–06) ||29–19–5 || 
|-

|- align="center" 
|54||L||February 2, 2006||3–4 OT|| align="left"| @ Nashville Predators (2005–06) ||29–19–6 || 
|- align="center" bgcolor="#FFBBBB"
|55||L||February 4, 2006||0–3 || align="left"|  Detroit Red Wings (2005–06) ||29–20–6 || 
|- align="center" bgcolor="#CCFFCC" 
|56||W||February 7, 2006||5–2 || align="left"|  Edmonton Oilers (2005–06) ||30–20–6 || 
|- align="center" bgcolor="#CCFFCC" 
|57||W||February 9, 2006||2–1 || align="left"| @ Minnesota Wild (2005–06) ||31–20–6 || 
|- align="center" bgcolor="#CCFFCC" 
|58||W||February 10, 2006||4–1 || align="left"| @ Columbus Blue Jackets (2005–06) ||32–20–6 || 
|- align="center" bgcolor="#FFBBBB"
|59||L||February 12, 2006||3–6 || align="left"| @ Detroit Red Wings (2005–06) ||32–21–6 || 
|- align="center" bgcolor="#CCFFCC" 
|60||W||February 28, 2006||4–2 || align="left"|  Minnesota Wild (2005–06) ||33–21–6 || 
|-

|- align="center" bgcolor="#CCFFCC" 
|61||W||March 2, 2006||1–0 || align="left"|  Columbus Blue Jackets (2005–06) ||34–21–6 || 
|- align="center" bgcolor="#FFBBBB"
|62||L||March 4, 2006||3–5 || align="left"| @ Dallas Stars (2005–06) ||34–22–6 || 
|- align="center" bgcolor="#FFBBBB"
|63||L||March 5, 2006||3–5 || align="left"| @ Minnesota Wild (2005–06) ||34–23–6 || 
|- align="center" bgcolor="#CCFFCC" 
|64||W||March 7, 2006||2–1 SO|| align="left"| @ St. Louis Blues (2005–06) ||35–23–6 || 
|- align="center" bgcolor="#CCFFCC" 
|65||W||March 9, 2006||2–1 || align="left"| @ Chicago Blackhawks (2005–06) ||36–23–6 || 
|- align="center" bgcolor="#CCFFCC" 
|66||W||March 12, 2006||3–0 || align="left"|  Calgary Flames (2005–06) ||37–23–6 || 
|- align="center" bgcolor="#FFBBBB"
|67||L||March 13, 2006||3–4 || align="left"| @ Calgary Flames (2005–06) ||37–24–6 || 
|- align="center" bgcolor="#FFBBBB"
|68||L||March 19, 2006||5–6 || align="left"| @ San Jose Sharks (2005–06) ||37–25–6 || 
|- align="center" bgcolor="#CCFFCC" 
|69||W||March 20, 2006||5–0 || align="left"| @ Los Angeles Kings (2005–06) ||38–25–6 || 
|- align="center" 
|70||L||March 22, 2006||4–5 OT|| align="left"| @ Mighty Ducks of Anaheim (2005–06) ||38–25–7 || 
|- align="center" bgcolor="#CCFFCC" 
|71||W||March 25, 2006||3–2 OT|| align="left"| @ St. Louis Blues (2005–06) ||39–25–7 || 
|- align="center" 
|72||L||March 26, 2006||3–4 SO|| align="left"|  Edmonton Oilers (2005–06) ||39–25–8 || 
|- align="center" bgcolor="#CCFFCC" 
|73||W||March 28, 2006||4–3 || align="left"|  Mighty Ducks of Anaheim (2005–06) ||40–25–8 || 
|- align="center" bgcolor="#FFBBBB"
|74||L||March 31, 2006||3–6 || align="left"| @ Calgary Flames (2005–06) ||40–26–8 || 
|-

|- align="center" bgcolor="#CCFFCC" 
|75||W||April 3, 2006||4–3 || align="left"|  Chicago Blackhawks (2005–06) ||41–26–8 || 
|- align="center" bgcolor="#FFBBBB"
|76||L||April 5, 2006||1–2 || align="left"|  San Jose Sharks (2005–06) ||41–27–8 || 
|- align="center" bgcolor="#CCFFCC" 
|77||W||April 8, 2006||4–2 || align="left"|  St. Louis Blues (2005–06) ||42–27–8 || 
|- align="center" bgcolor="#FFBBBB"
|78||L||April 9, 2006||2–5 || align="left"|  Minnesota Wild (2005–06) ||42–28–8 || 
|- align="center" bgcolor="#CCFFCC" 
|79||W||April 11, 2006||6–4 || align="left"|  Phoenix Coyotes (2005–06) ||43–28–8 || 
|- align="center" bgcolor="#FFBBBB"
|80||L||April 13, 2006||0–2 || align="left"| @ Calgary Flames (2005–06) ||43–29–8 || 
|- align="center" 
|81||L||April 15, 2006||3–4 OT|| align="left"| @ Vancouver Canucks (2005–06) ||43–29–9 || 
|- align="center" bgcolor="#FFBBBB"
|82||L||April 17, 2006||2–4 || align="left"| @ Edmonton Oilers (2005–06) ||43–30–9 || 
|-

|-
| Legend:

Playoffs

|- align="center" bgcolor="#CCFFCC"
| 1 ||W|| April 22 || 5–2 || align="left"| @ Dallas Stars || Avalanche lead 1–0 || 
|- align="center" bgcolor="#CCFFCC"
| 2 ||W|| April 24 || 5–4 OT || align="left"| @ Dallas Stars || Avalanche lead 2–0 || 
|- align="center" bgcolor="#CCFFCC"
| 3 ||W|| April 26 || 4–3 OT || align="left"| Dallas Stars || Avalanche lead 3–0 || 
|- align="center" bgcolor="#FFBBBB"
| 4 ||L|| April 28 || 1–4 || align="left"| Dallas Stars || Avalanche lead 3–1 || 
|- align="center" bgcolor="#CCFFCC"
| 5 ||W|| April 30 || 3–2 OT || align="left"| @ Dallas Stars || Avalanche win 4–1 || 
|-

|- align="center" bgcolor="#FFBBBB"
| 1 ||L|| May 5 || 0–5 || align="left"| @ Anaheim Mighty Ducks || Mighty Ducks lead 1–0 || 
|- align="center" bgcolor="#FFBBBB"
| 2 ||L|| May 7 || 0–3 || align="left"| @ Anaheim Mighty Ducks || Mighty Ducks lead 2–0 || 
|- align="center" bgcolor="#FFBBBB"
| 3 ||L|| May 9 || 3–4 OT || align="left"| Anaheim Mighty Ducks || Mighty Ducks lead 3–0 || 
|- align="center" bgcolor="#FFBBBB"
| 4 ||L|| May 11 || 1–4 || align="left"| Anaheim Mighty Ducks || Mighty Ducks win 4–0 || 
|-

|-
| Legend:

Player statistics

Scoring
 Position abbreviations: C = Center; D = Defense; G = Goaltender; LW = Left Wing; RW = Right Wing
  = Joined team via a transaction (e.g., trade, waivers, signing) during the season. Stats reflect time with the Avalanche only.
  = Left team via a transaction (e.g., trade, waivers, release) during the season. Stats reflect time with the Avalanche only.

Goaltending
  = Joined team via a transaction (e.g., trade, waivers, signing) during the season. Stats reflect time with the Avalanche only.
  = Left team via a transaction (e.g., trade, waivers, release) during the season. Stats reflect time with the Avalanche only.

Awards and records

Awards

Transactions
The Avalanche were involved in the following transactions from February 17, 2005, the day after the 2004–05 NHL season was officially cancelled, through June 19, 2006, the day of the deciding game of the 2006 Stanley Cup Finals.

Trades

Players acquired

Players lost

Signings

Draft picks
Colorado's draft picks at the 2005 NHL Entry Draft held at the Westin Hotel in Ottawa, Ontario.

See also
2005–06 NHL season

Notes

References

Colorado
Colorado
Colorado Avalanche seasons
Colorado Avalanche
Colorado Avalanche